Sheida may refer to:
 Mirza Abbas Khan Sheida (1873–1949), Iranian sufi, poet and journalist
 Sheida (film), a 1999 Iranian film

See also